Iosif Szökő (18 March 1930 – 2008) was a Romanian footballer of Hungarian descent, who played as a forward for Romania national football team and teams such ICO Oradea and Dinamo București.

Club career
Born in Marghita, Bihor County, Szökő started his career at the local club, Bihoreana Marghita, a county level side. After some friendly games against Rapid București, CFR Oradea and ICO Oradea, young Szökő was offered by CFR Oradea, team against which he scored three goals. Then, after a 3rd place in the Divizia B, Iosif Szökő moved in the great team of ICO Oradea and won a national title, before moving to Dinamo București, where he won another national title and a Romanian Cup, also obtaining five second places and being a Cup finalist one time.

After retirement he started a football manager career being the assistant coach of Virgil Mărdărescu at Dinamo Pitești, then he worked as an assistant coach at Dinamo București, where he was also the manager of various youth squads and between 1970s and 1980s was an important scouter. Among the players he coached, were names such as Dudu Georgescu and Alexandru Sătmăreanu.

International career
Iosif Szökő played 11 games at international level for Romania. He made his debut at the 1954 World Cup qualifiers under coach Gheorghe Popescu I, playing in three games, the first one was a 3–1 victory against Bulgaria, the second was a 2–1 victory against Bulgaria and the third was a 1–0 loss against Czechoslovakia. His following 8 games were friendlies, his last appearance was in a 1–0 away victory against Yugoslavia.

Honours
ICO Oradea
Divizia A: 1948–49

Dinamo București
Divizia A: 1955
Cupa României: 1958–59
Cupa României: Runner-up 1954

References

External links
 
 
 

1930 births
2008 deaths
People from Marghita
Romanian sportspeople of Hungarian descent
Romanian footballers
Romania international footballers
Association football forwards
Liga I players
Liga II players
CA Oradea players
FC Dinamo București players
Romanian football managers